Jack (John Francis) Santino, Ph.D. is an academic folklorist.

His work 
He is a Professor of Popular Culture at Bowling Green State University and is Director of the Bowling Green Center for Culture Studies. His work has primarily focused on ritual, celebrations, and holidays as well as occupational culture and popular music. He has been a featured expert on a television special produced by The History Channel, about Hallowe'en.

Along with Paul Wagoner, Santino produced Miles of Smiles, Years of Struggle a film, winner of four regional Emmy Awards on African American Pulman car unionisation.

From 1996 to 2000 Santino was the editor of the Journal of American Folklore. During 2002-3 Santino was the president of the American Folklore Society.

Early life 
He was born in Boston, Massachusetts on August 1, 1947. He received a bachelor's degree in English at Boston College.  He then studied Folklore at the University of Pennsylvania, where he earned his Ph.D. in 1978.  His thesis was entitled "The outlaw emotions : workers' narratives from three contemporary occupations".  
He has nine published books listed in WorldCat. He has three children: Ian, Will and Hannah.

Books
 2005: Spontaneous Shrines and Public Memorializations of Death, New York: Palgrave Macmillan.
 2003: (with Cristina Sánchez-Carretero) Holidays, Ritual, Festival, Celebration, and Public Display, Biblioteca de Estudios Norteamericanos, 7. Alcalá de Henares: Universidad de Alcalá.
 2001: Signs of War and Peace: Social Conflict and the Use of Public Symbols in Northern Ireland, New York: Palgrave.
 1998: The Hallowed Eve: Dimensions of Culture in a Calendar Festival in Northern Ireland. Irish literature, history, and culture, Lexington, Ky: University Press of Kentucky.
 1998: Miles of Smiles, Years of Struggle: Stories of Black Pullman Porters. Urbana: University of Illinois Press.
 1996: New Old-Fashioned Ways: Holidays and Popular Culture, Knoxville: University of Tennessee Press.
 1994: Halloween and Other Festivals of Death and Life, Knoxville: University of Tennessee Press.
 1994: All Around the Year: Holidays and Celebrations in American Life, Urbana: University of Illinois Press.
 1985: Healing, Magic, and Religion, Los Angeles, Calif: California Folklore Society.

See also 
 Bowling Green State University Department of Popular Culture

References

1947 births
Living people
Morrissey College of Arts & Sciences alumni
University of Pennsylvania alumni
Bowling Green State University faculty
American folklorists
Presidents of the American Folklore Society